Delicias is one of the 67 municipalities of Chihuahua, in northern Mexico. The capital lies at Delicias. The municipality covers an area of 335.4 km².

As of 2010, the municipality had a total population of 137,935, up from 127,211 as of 2005. 

As of 2010, the city of Delicias had a population of 118,071. Other than the city of Delicias, the municipality had 687 localities, the largest of which (with 2010 populations in parentheses) were: Colonia Revolución (3,995), Miguel Hidalgo (2,850), classified as urban; and Colonia Campesina (2,365), Colonia Nicolás Bravo (Kilómetro Noventa y Dos) (1,772), Colonia Terrazas (1,602), and Colonia Abraham González (La Quemada) (1,404), classified as rural.

Politics

Municipal presidents
(1974 - 1976): Fernando Baeza Meléndez
(1976 - 1977): Salvador Montelongo
(1977 - 1980): Carlos Manuel Carrasco Chacón
(1980 - 1983): Lorenzo Treviño de los Santos
(1983 - 1986): Horacio González de las Casas
(1986): Gabriel Baeza Vitolás
(1986 - 1989): Jaime Ríos Velasco
(1989 - 1990): Oscar Villalobos Chávez
(1990 - 1992): Gloria Cervantes
(1992 - 1995): Rogelio Bejarano
(1995 - 1998): Rogelio Muñoz
(1998 - 2001): Manuel Soltero Delgado
(2001 - 2004): Héctor Baeza Terrazas
(2004 - 2007): Guillermo Márquez Lizalde
(2007 - 2010): Jesús Heberto Villalobos Maynez

References

Municipalities of Chihuahua (state)